Goldach is a municipality in the Wahlkreis (constituency) of Rorschach in the canton of St. Gallen in Switzerland.

History
Goldach is first mentioned in 789 as Goldaha, though this comes from a later copy of the original document.  In 847 it was mentioned as Coldaun.

Geography

Of this area, 33.1% is used for agricultural purposes, while 12.7% is forested. Of the rest of the land, 51.9% is settled (buildings or roads) and the remainder (2.3%) is non-productive (rivers or lakes).

The municipality is located in the Rorschach Wahlkreis.  It is located on the road between Rorschach and St. Gallen and stretches from Lake Constance to the Rorschacherberg.  It consists of the village sections of Ober-Goldach, Unter-Goldach and Riet.

Coat of arms
The blazon of the municipal coat of arms is Azure two Bars wavy Or.

Demographics
, about 20.6% of the population was made up of foreign nationals. Of the foreign population,, 128 are from Germany, 625 are from Italy, 481 are from ex-Yugoslavia, 129 are from Austria, 69 are from Turkey,  and 218 are from another country. Over the last 10 years the population has grown at a rate of 8.5%. Most of the population speaks German (89.5%), with Italian being second most common ( 4.0%) and Serbo-Croatian being third ( 2.2%). Of the Swiss national languages, 7,552 speak German, 19 people speak French, 337 people speak Italian, and 12 people speak Romansh.

The age distribution, in Goldach is; 935 children or 11.1% of the population are between 0 and 9 years old and 1,029 teenagers or 12.2% are between 10 and 19.  Of the adult population, 951 people or 11.3% of the population are between 20 and 29 years old.  1,395 people or 16.5% are between 30 and 39, 1,178 people or 14.0% are between 40 and 49, and 1,098 people or 13.0% are between 50 and 59.  The senior population distribution is 862 people or 10.2% of the population are between 60 and 69 years old, 657 people or 7.8% are between 70 and 79, there are 289 people or 3.4% who are between 80 and 89, and there are 46 people or 0.5% who are between 90 and 99, and 1 person who is 100 or more.

 there were 1,176 persons (or 13.9% of the population) who were living alone in a private dwelling.  There were 2,169 (or 25.7%) persons who were part of a couple (married or otherwise committed) without children, and 4,446 (or 52.7%) who were part of a couple with children.  There were 390 (or 4.6%) people who lived in single parent home, while there are 49 persons who were adult children living with one or both parents, 40 persons who lived in a household made up of relatives, 59 who lived household made up of unrelated persons, and 112 who are either institutionalized or live in another type of collective housing.

In the 2007 federal election the most popular party was the SVP which received 36.1% of the vote.  The next three most popular parties were the CVP (21.7%), the SP (18.4%) and the FDP (12.7%).

The entire Swiss population is generally well educated.  In Goldach about 73.8% of the population (between age 25-64) have completed either non-mandatory upper secondary education or additional higher education (either university or a Fachhochschule).  Out of the total population in Goldach, the highest education level completed by 1,939 people (23.0% of the population) was Primary, while 3,516 (41.7%) have completed Secondary, 939 (11.1%) have attended a Tertiary school, and 291 (3.4%) are not in school.  The remainder did not answer this question.

The historical population is given in the following table:

Economy
, Goldach had an unemployment rate of 1.98%.  , there were 65 people employed in the primary economic sector and about 12 businesses involved in this sector.  2,200 people are employed in the secondary sector and there are 92 businesses in this sector.  1,613 people are employed in the tertiary sector, with 247 businesses in this sector.

 the average unemployment rate was 3.6%.  There were 345 businesses in the municipality of which 91 were involved in the secondary sector of the economy while 245 were involved in the third.

 there were 1,169 residents who worked in the municipality, while 3,191 residents worked outside Goldach and 1,507 people commuted into the municipality for work.

Religion
Of the rest of the population, there are 5 individuals (or about 0.06% of the population) who belong to the Christian Catholic faith, there are 229 individuals (or about 2.71% of the population) who belong to the Orthodox Church, and there are 215 individuals (or about 2.55% of the population) who belong to another Christian church. There are 306 (or about 3.63% of the population) who are Islamic. There are 25 individuals (or about 0.30% of the population) who belong to another church (not listed on the census), 549 (or about 6.50% of the population) belong to no church, are agnostic or atheist, and 75 individuals (or about 0.89% of the population) did not answer the question.

Notable people
Sebastian Gebhard Messmer, Roman Catholic Archbishop of the Roman Catholic Archdiocese of Milwaukee, Milwaukee, Wisconsin was born in Goldach.

Sights
The Schlosslandschaft Rorschach / Alter Rhein, a number of castles in a region along the Rhine river, is designated as part of the Inventory of Swiss Heritage Sites.  The Schlosslandschaft is shared between Berg, Goldach, Mörschwil, Rheineck, Rorschacherberg, St. Margrethen, Steinach, Thal and Tübach.

References

External links

 Official website 
 

Municipalities of the canton of St. Gallen